Sailing at the 2010 Asian Beach Games was held from 9 December to 13 December 2010 in Muscat, Oman.

Medalists

Men

Women

Open

Medal table

Results

Men

RS:X
9–13 December

Techno 293
9–13 December

Women

RS:X
9–13 December

Techno 293
9–13 December

Open

Laser Radial
9–13 December

Hobie 16
9–13 December

References 

Official Site

2010
2010 Asian Beach Games events
Asian Beach Games
Sailing competitions in Oman